Henrik Lacaj (1909–1991) was an Albanian humanitarian, linguist, and translator. He authored textbooks, plays, and various studies on historical figures such as Scanderbeg and Luigj Gurakuqi, but in Albania he is most venerated for his numerous translations of Latin and Greek masterpieces.

Bibliography

Original works

Translated works

References 

Linguists from Albania
Albanian translators
Albanian philologists
People from Shkodër
20th-century Albanian educators
Albanian Roman Catholics
1909 births
1991 deaths
20th-century translators
Translators of Ancient Greek texts
Latin–Albanian translators
Italian–Albanian translators
Translators of Virgil
20th-century linguists
20th-century philologists